Franz K. Opitz (1916–1988) was a Swiss painter.

References
This article was initially translated from the German Wikipedia.

20th-century Swiss painters
Swiss male painters
1916 births
1988 deaths
20th-century Swiss male artists